The International Youth Students for Social Equality (IYSSE) is the youth and student organization of the Socialist Equality Party (SEP) and the International Committee of the Fourth International, an international Trotskyist organization. Launched in 2006, the IYSSE aims to build an international socialist movement of students and workers opposing militarist violence, social inequality and attacks on democratic rights. The IYSSE continues the work of its predecessor the Students for Social Equality and the International Students for Social Equality, with student clubs at Universities and High Schools worldwide.

Chapters of the IYSSE hold regular meetings to educate students on Marxism and Socialism and to debate and discuss contemporary political issues. In February 2007 a German chapter of the IYSSE held a meeting at the Technical University of Berlin to discuss the US war plans against Iran, and an Australian chapter of the IYSSE intervened in meeting held at the University of New South Wales.

On March 31 and April 1, 2007, the IYSSE and the SEP held an international conference in Ann Arbor, Michigan opposing the war in Iraq and a potential war with Iran. Those attending the conference voted unanimously for the conference resolution. The resolution adopted connects the expansion of US militarism, attacks on democratic rights, and the growth of social inequality within the US with the declining economic position of the US internationally. The resolution points to the capitalist nation-state system as the root cause of war and outlines the need for an international socialist movement to oppose war.

IYSSE members have been invited as representatives of third party, independent or socialist perspectives on political panels, with IYSSE members reaching news headlines during the recent "Occupy protests" in which students have been attacked or maced by police. The IYSSE has also hosted academic or intellectual events that have received broader attention; in November 2010, the Berlin branch of the German IYSSE hosted a public lecture by historian Alexander Rabinowitch, on the subject of The Russian Revolution suggesting renewed interest in the historical event.

In 2014, the IYSSE around the world hosted the first online International May Day Rally, where over 2000 people attended online from over 96 countries. The speeches focused on the global drive to war, the history of working class struggles, permanent revolution, and called for the development of socialist conscious workers and youth across the world.

The Sri Lankan IYSSE has received attention from major papers in Sri Lanka for its organization of students, workers, and contributions to election campaigns. The Sri Lankan IYSSE has sought to defend students' and workers' rights, and in so doing has opposed Tamil and Sinhalese ethnic divisions within the country.

References

External links
Official Site
Join the International Youth & Students for Social Equality! - United States
Contact the IYSSE

Student political organizations
International Committee of the Fourth International
Student wings of political parties
Student wings of communist parties